Sun Records was a jazz record company and label created by Sébastien Bernard in 1971 to distribute the label Center of the World Records, begun by the Free Jazz Quartet Center of the World. The quartet consisted of saxophonist Frank Wright, bassist Alan Silva, pianist Bobby Few, and drummer Muhammad Ali.

Discography

See also
 List of record labels
 Sun Records (Memphis) Tennessee based company of the same name
 Sun Records (other companies) Other record companies of the same name

References

External links
Sun Records catalog

American record labels
French record labels
Jazz record labels